TMF NL was a digital music television channel of MTV Networks Benelux that broadcast on all major digital platforms in the Netherlands and Belgium from 2005 to 2011. The station was presented along with three other digital channels of MTV Networks, namely TMF Pure, TMF Party and Nick Jr., and started on 1 May 2005. The channel only played videos by Dutch artists and was a spin-off of successful Dutch music channel TMF.

The channel, as well as the other activities of TMF Nederland (Netherlands) closed on 31 December 2011.

References

Music television channels
Defunct television channels in the Netherlands
Television channels in Flanders
Television channels in Belgium
Television channels and stations established in 2005
Television channels and stations disestablished in 2011
Music organisations based in the Netherlands